Baltimore City Landmark is a historic property designation made by the city of Baltimore, Maryland. Nominations are reviewed by the city's Commission for Historical & Architectural Preservation (CHAP) and planning board, and are passed by Baltimore City Council. The landmarks program was created in 1971.

CHAP also maintains a list of Historical and Architectural Preservation Districts, separate from its landmarks program. The district program includes 37 unique districts, many of which are also listed on the National Register of Historic Places.

As of 2012, the program had designated 163 exterior Baltimore City Landmarks and one interior landmark (for the interior of the Senator Theatre, whose exterior is also landmarked).

Also as of 2012, more than 56,000 properties were located in 24 city historic districts, receiving the same protection as individual Baltimore City Landmarks.

Criteria
In assessing landmarks, the city Commission for Historical & Architectural Preservation (CHAP) developed criteria based on the National Register Criteria for Evaluation. The city commission looks at:

 Significance to Baltimore history or historical events
 Association with people significant to Baltimore's history
Providing or being likely to provide important information to Baltimore prehistory or history
 The architecture, culture, engineering, or archaeology involved in the site
Having distinct characteristics of a type, period, or method of construction
 Integrity of location, design, materials, craftsmanship, feeling, or association
Having high artistic value or being part of a distinguishable entity
Representing the work of a skilled or notable artist, architect, or other worker

Landmarks

For consistency, the list below uses the name used in the Baltimore City Landmark List. The locations of all landmarks having coordinates listed below can be seen together in one map by selecting "Map all coordinates using OpenStreetMap" at the right of this page.

Landmarked interiors

See also

 National Register of Historic Places listings in Baltimore

References

External links

 
 Landmark list with descriptions
 Map of city landmarks

Baltimore-related lists
History of Baltimore
Lists of buildings and structures in Maryland
Lists of landmarks
Locally designated landmarks in the United States